In Mexican history, a  was a declaration of principles announced in conjunction with a rebellion, usually armed, against the central government of the country (or, in the case of a regional rebellion, against the state government). Mexican  were often more formal than the  that were their equivalent elsewhere in Spanish America and Spain. Some were as detailed as the United States Declaration of Independence.

A total of more than one hundred  were declared. One compendium, compiled by Román Iglesias González (Mexico City: UNAM, 1998), contains the full texts of 105 . About a dozen of these are widely considered to be of great importance in discussions of Mexican history.

Chronological list of Plans
Plan of Iguala (24 February 1821, Iguala, Guerrero): the proposal by Agustín de Iturbide and Vicente Guerrero for the post-Independence War settlement based on the "Three Guarantees" of Religion, Independence and Unity.
Plan of Veracruz (2 December 1822): Antonio López de Santa Anna calls for the creation of a republic.
Plan of Casa Mata (1 February 1823):  Antonio López de Santa Anna and Guadalupe Victoria called for the removal of Emperor Agustín de Iturbide.
Plan of Lobato (23 January 1824)
Plan of Perote (16 September 1828), Antonio López de Santa Anna: demanding nullification of the 1828 election results.
Plan of Jalapa  (4 December 1829, Xalapa, Veracruz): conservatives demanding the removal of President Vicente Guerrero.
 Plan of Veracruz (2 January 1832): Ciriaco Vázquez, later supported by Antonio López de Santa Anna, denounced Anastasio Bustamante. 
Plan of Huejotzingo (8 June 1833, Huejotzingo, Puebla): in which Mariano Arista denounced the liberal reforms of Valentín Gómez Farías and expressed support of Antonio López de Santa Anna.
Plan of Cuernavaca 25 May 1834. Denouncing the liberal reforms of Valentín Gómez Farías.
Plan of La Ciudadela (4 September 1841): rebellion against Anastasio Bustamante.
Plan de Hospico (20 October 1852): conservative rebellion calling for Santa Anna to be president. Succeeded in 1853.
Plan of Ayutla (24 February 1854, Ayutla, Guerrero): liberal coalition calling for the removal of President Antonio López de Santa Anna.
Plan of Tacubaya (17 December 1857, Tacubaya, Federal District): calling for the suspension of the 1857 Constitution, convocation of a constituent assembly under President Ignacio Comonfort.
Plan de la Noria (8 November 1871) Porfirio Díaz's failed attempt at overthrowing Benito Juarez.
Program of the Liberal Party 1 July 1906, St Louis, Missouri, USA: Ricardo Flores Magón and others. Sweeping political program that challenged the regime of Porfirio Díaz and called for radical reforms. Many of its provisions were incorporated into the Mexican Constitution of 1917.
Plan of San Luis Potosí (6 October 1910, San Luis Potosí, San Luis Potosí): Francisco I. Madero's call for Revolution and the overthrow of Porfirio Díaz on 20 November 1910. 
Plan of Ayala  (25 November 1911, Ciudad Ayala, Morelos): Emiliano Zapata's vision of post-Revolution Mexico.
Plan Orozquista (25 March 1912), "Chihuahua Headquarters" of Pascual Orozco. Declaration of rebe[llion against Francisco I. Madero.  Orozco's Plan included important articles addressing socio-economic issues of land reform and workers' rights.
Plan of Guadalupe (23 March 1913, Hacienda de Guadalupe in Ramos Arizpe, Coahuila): Venustiano Carranza's response to the assassination of Francisco I. Madero during the Ten Tragic Days, and denunciation of the usurper Victoriano Huerta. Additions to the plan widened its scope into reforms.
Pact of Torreón 4 July 1914. The agreement was nominally an updating of Carranza's Plan of Guadalupe drawn up by two division commanders of the Constitutionalist Army, Pancho Villa of the Division of the North and Pablo González Garza of the Division of the Northeast. It pressed for socio-economic reforms that were not part of the Plan of Guadalupe and designed to push Carranza to act.
Plan of San Diego (6 January 1915, San Diego, Texas): ambiguous in origin, it was either a Carrancista or Huertista plan to overthrow the governments of the American border states.
Plan of Agua Prieta (23 April 1920, Agua Prieta, Sonora): Álvaro Obregón, Adolfo de la Huerta, and Plutarco Elías Calles take up arms against the government of Venustiano Carranza.

See also
Index of Mexico-related articles
Politics in Mexico
History of Mexico

Footnotes

References

External links
Planes políticos, proclamas, manifiestos y otros documentos de la Independencia al México moderno, 1812–1940

Political history of Mexico
Mexican documents